SIX (Slovak Internet eXchange) is a Slovak internet exchange point, established at the Center of Computer Technology of Slovak University of Technology (STU). , the SIX interconnects 58 ISPs operating in the Slovak Republic, and has a peak traffic rate of 501 Gbit/s, making it the most significant exchange point in Slovakia.

Information 
 Location: Bratislava, Slovakia
 Interconnection points: 2
 Connected ISPs : 58
 Peak data transmission: 501 Gbit/s
 Founded: 1996

Notes

See also 
 List of Internet exchange points by size

External links 
 SIX homepage

Internet_exchange_points_in_Europe
Telecommunications companies of Slovakia
Telecommunications in Slovakia